Kali Nikitas (born 1964) received an MFA from CalArts in graphic design a BFA in graphic design from the University of Illinois at Chicago. She has an unconventional practice by wearing many hats. She is an academic administrator and trained graphic designer. She is a curator of events and a connector of talent to opportunity. She has worked with cities to enrich the lives of their citizens through art and design. 

Currently, Ms. Nikitas Chairs the Graphic Design and Illustration (BFA) and MFA Graphic Design departments at Otis College of Art and Design. Before Otis, she taught and or has been in administration at Northeastern University, Minneapolis College of Art and Design and The School of the Art Institute of Chicago.She partners with Stephan Jones Studio on exhibition, pop-up events and independently curates unique events that center around culture, design and sometimes food. 

Kali sits on the Alumni Council for CalArts and the Inglewood Open Studio Board. 

In the years when she was most active in her design practice, Kali curated international design exhibitions: "And She Told 2Friends: An International Exhibition of Graphic Design by Women" and "Soul Design" and facilitated Typo Berlin and Typo San Francisco, and she has hosted workshops and special events in the States and abroad. The work generated in her then studio, Graphic Design for Love (+$) was recognized in numerous publications and competitions such as: Emigre, Eye, I.D. and the ''AIGA Journal' American Center for Design, AIGA and the Type Directors Club.

Personal
Nikitas is married to artist Richard M. Shelton, Director of the Creative Action Program at Otis College of Art and Design. They live in a home in Inglewood, California built by Rudolph Schindler.

References

External links

AIGA website
Q&A: Sean Adams Interviews Kali Nikitas, Step Inside Design Online
www.kalinikitas.com

American graphic designers
University of Illinois Chicago alumni
1964 births
Living people
California Institute of the Arts alumni
Otis College of Art and Design faculty